Abundantia (minor planet designation: 151 Abundantia) is a stony main belt asteroid. It was discovered by Johann Palisa on 1 November 1875, from the Austrian Naval Observatory in Pula. The name was chosen by Edmund Weiss of the Vienna Observatory; although the name refers to Abundantia, a Roman goddess of luck, it was also chosen to celebrate the increasing numbers of asteroids that were being discovered in the 1870s.

Information from A. Harris as of 1 March 2001 indicates that 151 Abundantia is an S class (stony) asteroid with a diameter of 45.37 km and H = 9.24 .1728 and albedo of 0.03. The light curve collected over 6 nights from 2/16/2002 to 3/10/2002 confirmed the rotational period to be 19.718h.

Data from 2001 shows a diameter of 45.37 km. An occultation by the asteroid was observed on 10 December 2017, showing the asteroid to be highly elongated, with dimensions of roughly 24 x 52 km.

References

External links 
 Lightcurve Data for 51 Abundantia, Sunflower Observatory
 Lightcurve plot of 151 Abundantia, Palmer Divide Observatory, B. D. Warner (2006)
 Asteroid Lightcurve Database (LCDB), query form (info )
 Dictionary of Minor Planet Names, Google books
 Asteroids and comets rotation curves, CdR – Observatoire de Genève, Raoul Behrend
 Discovery Circumstances: Numbered Minor Planets (1)-(5000) – Minor Planet Center
 
 

000151
Discoveries by Johann Palisa
Named minor planets
000151
000151
18751101